Riccardo Ghedin and Claudio Grassi were the defending champions, but not to compete.

Second seeds Sergey Betov and Alexander Bury won the title over the local team of Andrey Golubev and Evgeny Korolev, 6–1, 6–4 in the final.

Seeds

Draw

Draw

References
 Main Draw

Astana Challenger- Doubles